The modifier letter right half ring is a character of the Unicode Spacing Modifier Letters range, used to transliterate:
 the letter aleph
 the Arabic letter hamza

See also
 Modifier letter left half ring
 Half ring
 Apostrophe
 Glottal stop
 Glottal stop (letter)
 Spiritus lenis

Phonetic transcription symbols